"Taste You" is the third and final single from Auf der Maur's self-titled solo debut. Like the album's previous single, it failed to chart in the U.S. Due to a successful UK tour, the song received a moderate amount of airplay and peaked at number 51. The song features guest vocals from Mark Lanegan, formerly of the bands Screaming Trees and Queens of the Stone Age.

It exists in French and English versions. The French version is distributed standard on the album in some countries (France), and as a hidden track at the end of the US version of the album.

Track listing
"Taste You" – 4:39 (Auf der Maur)
"Sergeant Politeness" (live) – 5:22 (Ken Andrews)
"You Could Ice Skate To This" – 3:42 (B. Balthazar)

2004 singles
Melissa Auf der Maur songs
Capitol Records singles
Songs written by Melissa Auf der Maur
2004 songs